Caroline Schuch (1739–1787), was a German actor and theater director.  She was married to the actor and theater director 
Franz Schuch (1741–1771) and managed the Stadttheater Königsberg after him in 1771–1787, while touring East Prussia during the summers. Alongside her spouse, she dominated the theater stage of East Prussia in the second half of the 18th-century and with him referred to as one of the most noted actors of her time.

References 

 Hugo Rasmus: Lebensbilder westpreußischer Frauen in Vergangenheit und Gegenwart. Nicolaus-Copernicus-Verlag, Münster 1984, .

1739 births
1787 deaths
18th-century German actresses
Women theatre directors
18th-century Prussian women
18th-century theatre managers